Webster Township is one of twelve townships in Harrison County, Indiana.

Geography
It is located in Indiana in the United States of America.

Demographics 
As of the 2021 census, its population was 1,408 and it contained 512 housing units. The unified school district is South Harrison. Within the town, there are an estimated 92.0% White, 4.0% Black, 0% Native, 4% Asian, 0% Pacific Islander, 0% Two or more races, 0% Hispanic or Latino, and 0% Other. The median household income averages $57,326 with $39, 422 per capita income. An estimated 3.9% of the population live below the poverty line.

References

External links
 Indiana Township Association
 United Township Association of Indiana

Townships in Harrison County, Indiana
Townships in Indiana